Look to Your Heart may refer to:
 Look to Your Heart (Perry Como album), 1968
 Look to Your Heart (Frank Sinatra album), 1959